Harlem's American Gangster is the sixth mixtape by American hip hop recording artist Jim Jones released to digital retailers on February 19, 2008 under Koch Records. The album peaked at number three on the Billboard Top R&B/Hip-Hop Albums chart and number one on the Top Rap Albums chart. The Koch CD was remixed and remastered from a limited edition release that came out the previous November. There was also a change in the track list, with some tracks added and others omitted. The mixtape is hosted by Dame Dash and features the entire ByrdGang crew. "Love Me No More" was released as a single but didn't reach any major Billboard charts.

Album information
Jim Jones explained to MTV why he chose to do the album,"The title of this mixtape is a bit controversial," Jim recently told Mixtape Monday about his response to Jay-Z's American Gangster. "[Roc-A-Fella co-founder] Dame [Dash] feels the same way I do about American gangsters: If you snitch, you're not an American gangster. Understand me. That's what we're doing it for." Dame actually crops up on the mixtape — he surfaces in the intro and in a series of skits — while Byrd Gang flagship member Max B did some co-writing. Don't miss "Byrd Gang Money," "Love Me No More" and "Up in Harlem."

Track listing

Differences from the original release
The Koch release omitted "Global Money Skit", "Two More Blocks", "Money Comes and Money Goes", and "Poverty" from the "unofficial" version, and added "Come on, Come On", "I Gotta Have It", "Lookin at the Game", "Rockefeller Laws", and "No Fuss". Additionally, The Game does not appear on "Love Me No More" as he does on the "unofficial" version of the album.

Charts

Weekly charts

Year-end charts

References

Jim Jones (rapper) albums
2008 mixtape albums
Albums produced by Chink Santana
Albums produced by Pete Rock
Albums produced by DJ Khalil
E1 Music albums
Diplomat Records albums